Atticista (i.e. the "Attic-ist) is a surname that can refer to two people in Classical history:

Aelius Dionysius, Greek rhetorician
Aelius Moeris, 2nd century Greek grammarian